Janez Zibler (born 18 February 1958) is a Slovenian alpine skier. He competed in the men's slalom at the 1980 Winter Olympics, representing Yugoslavia.

References

1958 births
Living people
Slovenian male alpine skiers
Olympic alpine skiers of Yugoslavia
Alpine skiers at the 1980 Winter Olympics
People from Tržič